The new Estadio León is a proposed stadium in Leon, Guanajuato. The Club León football team is expected to make this their home stadium upon its proposed completion in 2023. Its expected capacity is 35,000. The previous Estadio León was built in 1967.

References

Football venues in Mexico
Sports venues in Guanajuato
Proposed stadiums
Proposed buildings and structures in Mexico